Leeds Parish Church RFC was a semi-professional rugby league club based in Leeds, West Yorkshire, England. The club played semi-professional rugby league for a total of five seasons from 1896–97 to 1900–01. Each of the five seasons was spent in the Yorkshire Senior Competition. At the end of season 1900–01 the club withdrew from the league.

History

Early Days 

Leeds Parish Church Rugby Club was formed many years before the “Great Schism” of 1895.

As the game’s popularity increased and travel became easier due to the expansion of the railway network, Neath from South Wales embarked on Northern Tours. In 1887/88 a tour led them to play against Wortley (Leeds), Manningham (Bradford) and Hartlepool Rovers. In 1888-89 over the Christmas period they played games against Leeds Parish Church, Bramley, Radcliffe, Brighouse Rangers and Huddersfield, all within the space of six days.

The city of Leeds had an abundance of rugby football clubs and although members of the Yorkshire RFU (which was in turn a Constituent Body of the RFU), it was decided to form a ‘more local’ association. It was for this reason that the Leeds & District organization was formalised when a meeting took place at the Green Dragon Hotel, Leeds on 27 September 1888. The foundation clubs were Bramley, Holbeck, Hunslet, Kirkstall, Leeds Parish Church, Leeds St John’s (later to become Leeds (Rhinos), and Wortley.

In the early years of the sport, the Church elders and officials saw the development of its rugby football team as an attempt to stem the tide of drinking and depravity which they saw all around them in the city. The irony of their ‘muscular Christianity’ mission was that large numbers of its rugby team’s supporters were the newly arrived Jews who had been confined to the poorest areas like around the Leylands, near the city centre. They were not muscular, unloved by many Christians and condemned by their own religious leaders for breaking Shabbat. But they felt that it was a way to join in the life of the city.

A photograph of the Leeds Parish Church of 1893 is shown on the “Gallery” section of “The Goldthorpe Brothers” website– Gallery.

Northern Union 

In 1896, at a special meeting, Leeds Parish Church RFC, that season’s Yorkshire RFU champions, had only five votes against their switch of allegiance to the Northern Union. At the same time, most of the clubs who had played in the Yorkshire RFU 1st Division resigned. The following Summer most of the remaining 1st and 2nd Division teams resigned en bloc to form the second division of the Yorkshire Northern Rugby Union.

By June 1897 there were no rugby union clubs in the Halifax district RFU, the Bradford and Huddersfield district rugby unions voted to change affiliation to the Northern Union, and by the start of the following season the Yorkshire Post reported that “in Leeds, rugby union football is practically non-existent”.

They joined the ranks of the semi-professionals when they became members of the Northern Union in its second season 1896–97 and played for the following four season in the Yorkshire Senior Competition, which was effectively Division 2 (East).

In this first season Leeds Parish Church RFC managed only a lowly 13th place out of 16 clubs, but this was one position above their fierce rivals Leeds.

In the club’s second season 1897–98 they improved to a mid-table 8th out of 16 clubs, but, for the only time below Leeds.

The third season 1898–99 was their best when they excelled and finished 4th out of 16 clubs, whilst Leeds finished in 11th places.

In 1899–1900 the club slipped back finishing 14th out of 16, but still one place above Leeds.

And a slightly better position was reached in the final season 1900–01 when they finished in 10th place out of 16, this time three places above Leeds. Leeds Parish Church RFC dropped out of the league after the end of the season.

Only once in the five seasons did Leeds Parish Church RFC finish below Leeds, only once below Bramley but conversely only once did they finish above Hunslet.

In the early days, the club had been looked upon by the elders as a flagship of muscular Christianity, which the Jewish community had become passionately involved in.

It was closed down because of its rough play, attacking referees, a violent crowd (echoes of worldwide Association Football in the late 20th century) – but also, it has been suggested - because it attracted the Jewish working-class community.

Stadium 

The club’s stadium was on Clarence Road, a ground which attracted thousands of fans to their games when Leeds Parish Church RLC were a top team.

Club League Record 

The league positions for Leeds Parish Church RFC for the 5 seasons in which they played (semi) professional Rugby League are given in the following table:

Heading Abbreviations
RL = Single Division; Pl = Games played; W = Win; D = Draw; L = Lose; PF = Points for; PA = Points against; Diff = Points difference (+ or -); Pts = League points
% Pts = A percentage system was used to determine league positions due to clubs playing varying number of fixtures and against different opponents 
League points: for win = 2; for draw = 1; for loss = 0.

Several fixtures & results 
The following are just a few of Leeds Parish Church RFC fixtures during the three seasons (and other times) in which they played semi-professional rugby league:

Notes and Comments 

1 - Folly Fields is the stadium used by Wigan at the time until 1901. They then became sub-tenants of Springfield Park See below - Note 3.

2 - Lowerhouse Lane is the original site of the current ground used by Widnes. It was renamed Naughton Park in 1932 in honour of club secretary, Tom Naughton - and later renamed Halton Stadium after being completely rebuilt in 1997.
3 - Wigan became sub-tenants of Springfield Park, which they shared with Wigan United AFC, playing their first game there on 14 September 1901 at which a crowd of 4,000 saw them beat Morecambe 12–0, and the last game on 28 April 1902 when Wigan beat the Rest of Lancashire Senior Competition. A temporary ground was necessary to span the period between moving from Folly Fields and the new ground at Central Park being constructed.

Notable players
John Wilkinson Birch

See also 
Rugby league county leagues
List of defunct rugby league clubs

References

External links
1895 And All That...: Inside Rugby League's Hidden History - chapter The curious rise and fall of Leeds parish church RFC
html Caryl Phillips interviews Anthony Clavane in Leeds: 21/10/2010 ‘The Promised Land?’
Leeds Parish Church 1893

Rugby league teams in West Yorkshire
Defunct rugby league teams in England
Sport in Leeds
Rugby clubs established in 1895
1895 establishments in England